Brownlee may refer to:

People
 Brownlee (surname)

Places
 Brownlee Dam
 Brownlee, Nebraska
 Brownlee, Oregon
 Brownlee Park, Michigan
 Brownlee, Saskatchewan
 Robert Brownlee Observatory